The Department of Information and Communication Technology (তথ্য ও যোগাযোগ প্রযুক্তি অধিদপ্তর) is a government department responsible for information and communication technology projects in Bangladesh. It is located in Dhaka, Bangladesh.

History
The Department of Information and Communication Technology was established on 1 July 2013 as part of the Bangladesh Awami League governments digital Bangladesh policy under the Ministry of Posts, Telecommunications and Information Technology. The department plans to establish computer labs in all schools across Bangladesh.

References

Government departments of Bangladesh
2013 establishments in Bangladesh
Organisations based in Dhaka